Elsinore Multimedia, Inc. was a software and video game developer based in Hollywood, Florida. The company produced products including the Essential Language series and the Cabela's Big Game Hunter series. Elsinore was acquired by Activision, Inc. in 1999.

In 2001, Activision combined Elsinore Multimedia with Head Games Publishing and Expert Software to form Activision Value.

References

Video game companies of the United States
Video game development companies
Hollywood, Florida